The Church of Saint-Louis-des-Chartrons is a Roman Catholic church located in Bordeaux, France. It is a gothic revival church dedicated to Saint Louis, king of France (1214–1270).

History and description 
Saint-Louis Church was built between 1874 and 1880 following the plans of Pierre-Charles Brun. Consecration occurred in 1895 by Mgr Lecot. It is 60.35 meters long by 23 meters wide and 22.26 meters high under vaults. The high towers measure 58 meters and are visible from all over the city above the elegant quartier des Chartrons (Chartrons district), on the north of Place des Quinconces.

The stained-glass windows are particularly remarkable; they come from the workshops of Henri Feur (1899) and Nicolas Lorin (1879, in the choir).

Organ 
The organ is registered on French monuments historiques. It was built by Georges Wenner in 1881, remade by Gaston Maille in 1901 and repaired by Pascal Quoirin in 2005.

References

External links 
 Saint Louis Parish website, in French

Louis
Bordeaux Louis